Michigan's 33rd Senate district is one of 38 districts in the Michigan Senate. The 33rd district was created in 1953, as dictated by the 1908 Michigan Constitution. The previous 1850 constitution only allowed for 32 senate districts. It has been represented by Republican Rick Outman since 2019, succeeding fellow Republican Judy Emmons.

Geography
District 33 encompasses all of Newaygo and Montcalm counties, as well as parts of Ionia, Kent, Lake, Muskegon, and Ottawa counties.

2011 Apportionment Plan
District 33, as dictated by the 2011 Apportionment Plan, covered all of Clare, Gratiot, Isabella, Mecosta, and Montcalm Counties in the dead center of the state. Communities in the district included Mount Pleasant, Big Rapids, Alma, St. Louis, Greenville, Clare, Harrison, Ithaca, Canadian Lakes, and Union Township.

The district was located almost entirely within Michigan's 4th congressional district, also slightly extending into the 3rd district. It overlapped with the 70th, 93rd, 97th, 99th, and 102nd districts of the Michigan House of Representatives.

List of senators

Recent election results

2018

2014

Federal and statewide results in District 33

Historical district boundaries

References 

33
Clare County, Michigan
Gratiot County, Michigan
Isabella County, Michigan
Mecosta County, Michigan
Montcalm County, Michigan